Julian Hodek (born 9 May 1998) is a German footballer who plays as a midfielder for the Florida International University men's soccer team.

References

External links
 
 
 Julian Hodek at FuPa
 USL League Two bio

1998 births
Living people
German footballers
Association football midfielders
FSV Zwickau players
3. Liga players
Regionalliga players
Berliner FC Dynamo players
People from Werder (Havel)
Footballers from Brandenburg
German expatriate footballers
German expatriate sportspeople in the United States
Expatriate soccer players in the United States
FIU Panthers men's soccer players
USL League Two players